George Casey may refer to:
 George W. Casey Sr. (1922–1970), U.S. Army general
 George W. Casey Jr. (born 1948), Chief of Staff of the U.S. Army, and the son of the above
 George Elliott Casey (1850–1903), Canadian journalist and politician

See also
 Casey (disambiguation)
 George (disambiguation)